The Young Journalists Club (YJC) is a news agency in Iran. It was established in 1999 by the political affairs bureau of Islamic Republic of Iran Broadcasting and aims to help enthusiastic youth become professional journalists. The YCG is affiliated with Iran's official state broadcaster.

See also

List of Iranian news agencies

References

External links
 
 
 
(in Arabic) yjc.ir/ar

1999 establishments in Iran
Organizations established in 1999
News agencies based in Iran
Iranian news websites